Eike Mund (born 3 March 1988) is a German footballer who plays as a defender for TuS Mayen.

Career
Mund made his professional debut for TuS Koblenz in the 3. Liga on 14 November 2010, coming on as a substitute in the 87th minute for Christian Pospischil in the 3–0 home win against SV Sandhausen.

References

External links
 Profile at DFB.de
 Profile at kicker.de

1988 births
Living people
People from Andernach
Footballers from Rhineland-Palatinate
German footballers
Association football defenders
TuS Koblenz players
3. Liga players
Regionalliga players
TuS Mayen players